Pyrgocythara densestriata is a species of sea snail, a marine gastropod mollusk in the family Mangeliidae.

Description
The white shell, without band, contains 10 to 12 longitudinal ribs.

Distribution
This species occurs in the Caribbean Sea off Cuba.and in the West Indies.
.

References

 Adams, C. B. 1850. Description of supposed new species of marine shells which inhabit Jamaica. Contributions to Conchology, 4: 56–68, 109–123

External links
 

densestriata
Gastropods described in 1850
Taxa named by Charles Baker Adams